Hospital Saint Bois is a hospital located at Camino Fauquet 6358, Villa Colón on the northwestern outskirts of Montevideo, Uruguay. It consists of a General Hospital and Eye Hospital. It was founded on November 18, 1928, and designed by Joaquín Torres García.

References

External links
Official site
Official site of the Eye Hospital

Hospitals established in 1928
Hospitals in Montevideo
1928 establishments in Uruguay